Angler may refer to:

 A fisherman who uses the fishing technique of angling
 Angler (video game)
 The angler, Lophius piscatorius, a monkfish
 More generally, any anglerfish in the order Lophiiformes
 Angler: The Cheney Vice Presidency, a book written by Barton Gellman in 2008 about Vice President Dick Cheney, whose Secret Service codename was "Angler"
 The Huawei Nexus 6P, codename angler